John Beale Bordley, (February 11, 1727 Annapolis, Maryland – January 26, 1804 Philadelphia) was a Maryland planter and judge.

Life
He was the son of Thomas Bordley, from Yorkshire, England 1694, attorney general for Maryland, and his second wife Ariana Vanderheyden. A half-sister, through his mother's subsequent marriage to Edmund Jenings (1703-1756), was Ariana Jenings Randolph, the wife of prominent Virginia loyalist John Randolph, making Bordley the uncle of the first Attorney General of the United States, Edmund Randolph.

He was educated at the library of his step brother, Stephan Hadley,
At the age to ten, he went to live with his uncle in Chestertown. He received his early education under the direction of the Chestertown Free School teacher, Charles Peale.

Colonial Posts
He married Margaret Chew, (June 29, 1735 – November 11, 1773), in 1750, and went to live at Joppa, Maryland, then the County Seat of Baltimore County. For the next 12 or 13 years he worked his plantation, and held the county clerkship. 
In 1768, he was one of the commissioners to help determine the boundary between Maryland and Delaware.  
On September 25, 1770, he was present at the Upper House of Assembly of Maryland.  
Later he moved to Baltimore City, where he was appointed a judge of the Provincial Court, and judge of the British Admiralty Court.  
He served as a member of Governor Horatio Sharpe's and Governor Sir Robert Eden, 1st Baronet, of Maryland's Councils.

Family

In 1770, his wife inherited from the Chew family half of Wye Island, in Queen Anne's County, on the Chesapeake Bay, (the other half going to his sister-in-law, Mary, wife of William Paca).  The Bordleys maintained their winter residence in Annapolis, they moved to his beautiful estate on Wye Island.  They had four children: Thomas Bordley (born 1755- 1771), Matthias Bordley (born 1757–1818), Henrietta Maria Bordley (born 1762), John Beale Bordley, Jr. (born 1764–1815)

After Margaret died, in 1777, he married Mrs. John Mifflin (Sarah Fishbourne) (October 20, 1733 – May 16, 1816), a widow of Philadelphia. (He became stepfather to Thomas Mifflin.)  Then the Bordley family wintered in Philadelphia, and a large farm in Chester County, Pennsylvania, "Como Farm". In 1783, he was elected a member of the American Philosophical Society. They had the daughter Elizabeth Bordley (1777–1863).

He is buried in St. Peter's Churchyard in Philadelphia.  Como farm is now a golf course.

Agriculture

In 1785, he encouraged the formation of the Philadelphia Society for Promoting Agriculture.  The archives of the society are held at the Van Pelt-Dietrich Library Center, University of Pennsylvania.

He developed an eight field system, which included three fields of clover in the rotation plan. He had hit upon the contribution of legumes to the soil. He also experimented with hemp, cotton, fruits, many kinds of vegetables, and animal husbandry. He established a profitable wheat trade with England and Spain, turning away from tobacco cultivation.  Washington corresponded with him about wheat.

Art
He was a childhood friend of Charles Willson Peale, whose father was his tutor.  He raised the funds to send Charles Willson Peale to London, where the young artist trained under Benjamin West in 1767, for two years. Bordley also helped Peale obtain his first major commission in America—two life-size portraits.  His grandson John Beale Bordley (1800–1882) was also an artist, who studied with Peale.

Works
A summary View Of The Courses of Crops, In The Husbandry of England and Maryland, (1784)
Sketches on Rotations of Crops and Other Rural Matters, (1797).
Country Habitations, (1798)
Essays and Notes on Husbandry and Rural Affairs, (1799), with additions in 1801, 566 pages

References

External links

John Beale Bordley Historical Marker, Chester County, PA

1727 births
1804 deaths
American jurists
Farmers from Maryland
American people of English descent
American planters
People from Annapolis, Maryland
People of colonial Maryland
Farmers from Pennsylvania
People from Joppatowne, Maryland
Burials at St. Peter's churchyard, Philadelphia